Hamid bin Ahmad Al Rifaie (born 1940) is a Saudi Arabian activist and thinker, president of the International Islamic Forum for Dialogue (IIFD ), and co-president of the World Muslim Congress.

Biography
Al-Rifaie was born in 1940 in Busor Alharer village in the Huraan region of Syria to a well-known family. His father, Sheikh Ahmed bin Zaal Beck Al-Rifaie, was an American educated tribal leader. His grandfather, Sheikh Zaal Beck Al-Rifaie, was also from the leaders and dignitaries in Huraan. He played an important role in the national revolution against the French, and was the right-hand man of Huraan Sheikh Ismail Pasha Al-Rifaie during and after the French mandate over Syria.

Hamid Al Rifaie earned his B.Sc. in chemistry and geology from the University of Damascus and M.Sc. in industrial organic chemistry from Al-Azhar University and Surry University. He was awarded his PhD in organic chemistry from Cairo University.

Career

International Islamic Forum for Dialogue
Al-Rifaie, during his activities in IIFD, signed more than ten protocols pertaining to dialogue between IIFD and international cultural and religious foundations such as:

The Pontifical Council for Interreligious Dialogue  - Vatican.
The American National Council of the Churches of Christ-Washington.
The Middle East Council of Churches - Cyprus.
The World Council of Churches - Geneva.
The Russian Cultural Glory Center - Moscow.
The World Buddhist Sangha Council - Taiwan .
The Middle East Institute for Peace and development - New York.
The World Hindu Council - New Delhi.

Academic position
 Secondary School - Teacher of Chemistry, 1962–1978.
 Professor of industrial organic chemistry–King Abdul Aziz University, 1978–1998.

Positions in the field of Islamic activities
 Member of Presidential institution, International Islamic Council for Da'wah and Relief.
 Co-president, Islamic-Catholic Liaison Committee – Vatican.
 Member of Committee of the Islamic Coordination in the Organisation of the Islamic Conference (OIC).
 Member of the experts Committee for Strategic Studies at the Organisation of the Islamic Conference (OIC).
 Vice President of the Islamic Information Committee.
 Member of the International Islamic Charity Commission.
 Member of the International Commission on Scientific Signs in the Qur'an and the Sunnah.
 Member 100Grop for world Peace.
 Member the World Council of the Religious Leaders.
 Member Supreme Committee of AL-Risalah Channel.
 Member of the world supreme council of the Mosques formerly.
 Prof. at King Abdul Aziz University formerly.
 Member of several international organizations and commissions.

Publications
 Several research papers in Chemistry.
 A great number (over 85) of papers, essays, and other publications in the field of Islamic thought and Civilizational Studies such as:
    

 "The Islamic Nation and the Crisis of Civilization".    
 "Mutual Acquaintance and human Security".   
 "Muslims and the West".  
 "Civility of Dialogue and disagreement in Islam". 
 "World Systems and Human Rights and Obligations".    
 Ethics of Islamic Discourse Addressed to Non-Muslims".    
 "Jerusalem and Secure Peace".    
 "And What about Globalization and Globalization?
 "Yes to Dialogue, No to Dialogue".    
 "Human Generations and Their Need to Be Introduced to the Islamic Project of Civilization".    
 "A Strategic Study of the Present and Future of Islamic Work".   
 "The Future Form of Unity and Islamic Solidarity".   
 "Globalization and Globalization: An Islamic Perspective".
 "Civilization and the Problem of Terminology and Performance".   
 "The Intermediary community as a Rational Basis for the Dialogue of Civilizations".    
 "Complementarity of Civilizations".
 "Islam and the launching Points of a Common Ground for World Civilizations".
 The Other and the Problem of Terminology and Dialogue.
 Partners Not Guardians: Islam and Its Response to Human Security Aspirations.
 Here we are ! Who are you ?
 AL-Bi'aoiah( Islamic Social contract) and the Democracy.
 Come to a Just Word.
 But you are Scum!
 March of dialogue in the recent history.
 Secularism between extremism and moderation.
 Al-Wasatiyyah And Orthodox pivot for dialogue of cultures.

References

External links
 International Islamic Forum For Dialogue
 WCC convenes international Christian - Muslim consultation
 Prince Contributes To Islamic "Dialog" Organization Tied to Global Muslim Brotherood
 Harmony, Peace & Universal Values: Buddhism & Islamic Perspective
 The First Session of Dialogue Between The International Islamic Forum for Dialogue (IIFD) & The Middle East Council of Churches (MECC) 
Islamic-Catholic committee condemns attacks against Iraqi churches
 Pontifical Council for Inter-Religious Dialogue, co-chaired the 3-day meeting along with Professor Hamid bin Ahmad Al-Rifaie, the president of the International Islamic Forum for Dialogue
 The Catholic delegation was headed by Cardinal Jean-Louis Tauran, president of the Pontifical Council for Interreligious Dialogue, while the Islamic delegation was headed by Professor Hamid bin Ahmad Al-Rifaie, president of the International Islamic Forum for Dialogue, of Jeddah, Saudi Arabia.
 Islamic-Catholic groups asks prayers for peace :Archbishop Michael Fitzgerald, president of the Pontifical Council for Inter-religious Dialogue and head of the Vatican delegation, and Prof. Hamid bin Ahmad AL-Rifaie, president of the International Islamic Forum for Dialogue in Jeddah, Saudi Arabia head of the Islamic delegation, signed the communique.
 Vatican City : Prof. Dr. Hamid Bin Ahmad Al-Rifaie, president of International Islamic Forum for Dialogue, and Archbishop Michael L. Fitzgerald president of Pontifical Council For Inter-religious Dialogue, signed the joint statement which was issued in both English and Arabic.
 The Problem of Women and Society, by: Prof. Dr. Hamid Bin Ahmad Al-Rifaie
  World Muslim Congress: A two-day seminar on "Harmony, Peace & Universal Values: Buddhism & Islamic Perspective", organized by the Jamiyah Singapore and Singapore Buddhist Lodge in co-operation with the International Islamic Forum for Dialogue, Saudi Arabia was held at Jamiyah Singapore recently.
 With the help of God the Islamic-Catholic Liaison Committee held its ninth meeting in the Vatican, 19-20 January 2004, equivalent to 27-28 Dhu al-Qa'da 1424. The Catholic delegation was headed by Archbishop Michael L. Fitzgerald, President of the Pontifical Council for Interreligious Dialogue, Vatican City, while the Islamic delegation was headed by Prof. Dr Hamid bin Ahmad Al-Rifaie, President of the International Islamic Forum for Dialogue, Jeddah.
 Statement on Islamic-Catholic Committee Meeting
 International Islamic Forum For Dialogue
 Dialogue With Vatican
 Dialogue With Middle East Council of Churches 
 Islamic – Catholic Liaison Committee
 The book " We and the other and the problem of the term and dialogue "  Author: Prof. Hamid Al-Rifaie - Publisher: World Muslim Congress - Publication Date: 2006
Complementarity of Civilizations - Prof. Hamid Al-Rifaie - President of the International Islamic Forum for Dialogue
 Islamic-Catholic Panel Reaches 5 Conclusions
The Book  " The March Muslim dialogue - Christian Contemporary "  By: Prof. Hamid Al-Rifaie - Publisher: World Muslim Congress - Publication Date: 2008
 Books List Of Prof AL-Rifaie ( Arabic - English)
  Prof. AL-Rifaie with Pope Of Vatican

21st-century imams
20th-century Saudi Arabian politicians
21st-century Saudi Arabian politicians
1940 births
Living people
Islamic democracy activists
Saudi Arabian Islamists
Saudi Arabian Muslims
Saudi Arabian religious leaders
Saudi Arabian Sunni Muslims
Sunni imams
Syrian expatriates in the United Kingdom
Syrian expatriates in Egypt
Syrian emigrants to Saudi Arabia